Five referendums were held in Switzerland during 1929. The first three were held on 3 March on the issues of grain supply (a proposal and counter-proposal) and a federal law on tariffs. The counter-proposal to the grain supply question and the tariffs law were both approved. The fourth and fifth referendums were held on 12 May on popular initiatives on road traffic and banning spirits. Both were rejected by voters.

Background
The grain supply, road traffic and spirits referendums were popular initiatives, which required a double majority; a majority of the popular vote and majority of the cantons. The decision of each canton was based on the vote in that canton. Full cantons counted as one vote, whilst half cantons counted as half. The tariffs law question was an optional referendum, requiring only a majority of voters in favour.

Results

Grain supply

Grain supply counterproposal

Tariffs law

Road traffic initiative

Spirits ban

References

1929 referendums
1929 in Switzerland
Referendums in Switzerland